Close Your Eyes may refer to:

Music 
 Close Your Eyes (band), an American melodic hardcore band

Albums 
 Close Your Eyes (Bic Runga album) or the title song, 2016
 Close Your Eyes (Glorium album), 1997
 Close Your Eyes (Kurt Elling album), 1995
 Close Your Eyes (Sarah McKenzie album), 2012
 Close Your Eyes (Stacey Kent album), 1997
 Close Your Eyes: A Collection 1965–1986, by Vincent Crane, 2008
 Close Your Eyes, or the title song (see below), by Edward Bear, 1973
 Close Your Eyes, by Ellie Drennan, 2015
 Close Your Eyes EP, by Close Your Eyes, 2008

Songs 
 "Close Your Eyes" (Bernice Petkere song), first recorded by Freddy Martin & His Orchestra, 1933; covered by many others
 "Close Your Eyes" (Carter and Tennent song), first recorded by Jack Hylton and his orchestra, 1931
 "Close Your Eyes" (Chuck Willis song), first recorded by The Five Keys, 1955; covered by many others, including Peaches & Herb (1967)
 "Close Your Eyes" (Edward Bear song), 1973
 "Close Your Eyes" (Parmalee song), 2014
 "Close Your Eyes (And Count to Fuck)", by Run the Jewels, 2014
 "Close Your Eyes", by Acen Razvi from 75 Minutes, 1994
 “Close Your Eyes”, by The All-American Rejects, 2017
 "Close Your Eyes", by Atomic Rooster from Made in England, 1972
 "Close Your Eyes", by Axium from Matter of Time, 2002
 "Close Your Eyes", by The Chemical Brothers from Push the Button, 2005
 "Close Your Eyes", by Dan + Shay from Where It All Began, 2014
 "Close Your Eyes", by Felix Jaehn, 2019
 "Close Your Eyes", by Juliana Hatfield from Beautiful Creature, 2000
 "Close Your Eyes", by Kim Petras from Turn Off the Light, Vol. 1, 2018
 "Close Your Eyes", by Lily Allen from Sheezus, 2014
 "Close Your Eyes", by The Lovin' Spoonful from Everything Playing, 1967
 "Close Your Eyes", by Meghan Trainor from Title, 2015
 "Close Your Eyes", by Michael Bublé from To Be Loved, 2013
 "Close Your Eyes", by Rhodes from Wishes, 2015
 "Close Your Eyes", by the String Cheese Incident from Outside Inside, 2001
 "Close Your Eyes", by Westlife from Coast to Coast, 2000
 "Close Your Eyes" (Buffy/Angel Love Theme), composed by Christophe Beck from Buffy the Vampire Slayer: The Album, 1999

Film
 Close Your Eyes (upcoming film), directed by Víctor Erice
 Doctor Sleep (2002 film), or Close Your Eyes, a 2002 film directed by Nick Willing

Other uses
"Close Your Eyes" (Fear the Walking Dead), a television episode
Close Your Eyes, a 2018 Singaporean television series featuring Edwin Goh
Close Your Eyes, a 2013 novel by Ewan Morrison

See also 
 Open Your Eyes (disambiguation)
 Eyelid